A miller is a person who owns or operates a mill which turns grain into flour.

Miller, Miller's, or Millers may also refer to:

People
 Miller Dunckel (1899–1975), Michigan politician
 Miller Forristall (born 1998), American football player
 Miller Huggins (1879–1929), American baseball player and manager
 Miller M. Duris (1928–2014), American politician
 Miller Pontius (1891–1960), American football player
 Miller Puckette (born 1959), American academic
 Miller Reese Hutchison (1876–1944), American electrical engineer
 Miller Williams (1930–2015), American poet, translator, editor
 Miller Wolf Oberman, American poet
 Miller Worsley (1791–1835), English naval officer
 Miller (surname)
 List of people with surname Miller

Places

United States

Inhabited places
 Miller, California, a former settlement
 Miller, Indiana
 Miller, Iowa
 Miller, Kansas
 Miller, Kentucky (disambiguation)
 Millers, Maryland
 Miller, Michigan
 Miller, Missouri
 Miller, Nebraska
 Miller's, Nevada, a ghost town
 Millers, New York
 Miller, Ohio
 Miller, Oklahoma
 Miller, South Dakota
 Miller Beach, a neighborhood of Gary, Indiana
 Miller County (disambiguation), in various states
 Miller Township (disambiguation)

Rivers
 Millers River (Connecticut River), Massachusetts
 Millers River (Middlesex), Massachusetts
 Millers River (Rhode Island)
 Miller River, Washington

Other places
 Miller (crater), a crater on the Moon
 Miller, New South Wales, Australia
 Miller, Edmonton, Alberta, Canada
 Miller Field (disambiguation)
 Miller Park (disambiguation)

Biology
 Miller (moth) (Acronicta leporina), a species of moth
 Miller, other moths of the genus Agrotis
 The miller, a common name for the fungus Clitopilus prunulus

Entertainment
 The Millers (2013–2015), an American television show
 The miller who was a wizard, a cheat and a matchmaker (also called The Miller), a Russian ballad opera by Mikhail Sokolovsky

Fictional characters
 Adam Miller, on the Australian soap opera Neighbours
 Barney Miller, title character on the American television show Barney Miller
 C. Miller, a player character in Call of Duty: World at War
 Chris and Nifty Miller, in the 1986 American fantasy drama film The Barker
 Chuck, David, Judy, and Ronald Miller, in the American teen romantic comedy 1987 movie Can't Buy Me Love 
 Daisy Miller, in the novella Daisy Miller by Henry James
 Kazuhira Miller, in Metal Gear series
 Kirsty Miller, a character from the British radio soap opera The Archers
 Lauren Miller, in the American sitcom television series Family Ties
 Leslie Miller, in the 1999 American black comedy mockumentary movie Drop Dead Gorgeous
 Liza Miller, in the American television series, Younger
 Luisa Miller, in the opera Luisa Miller by Giuseppe Verdi
 Marvin Miller (and his parents Jeff and Jenny), a two-year-old in the American comic strip Marvin
 Master Miller, a games series character; see list of recurring Metal Gear characters
 Mrs. Miller, in the 1994 American comedy film Robot in the Family
 Nick Miller, a character in American television series New Girl
 Phil Miller (The Last Man on Earth), in the American television series The Last Man on Earth, played by Will Forte
 Robyn Miller, in "The Miller's Tale" from The Canterbury Tales by Geoffrey Chaucer
 Sandra Miller, a character in the 1993 TV series Journey to the Center of the Earth
 Steve Miller, a character from the 2010 drama film The Last Song
 Windy Miller, in the British children's television show Camberwick Green
 the Miller family from the British television show EastEnders:
 Aleesha Miller
 Darren Miller
 Dawn Miller
 Demi Miller
 Keith Miller (EastEnders)
 Mickey Miller
 Rosie Miller

Companies
 Harry Miller (auto racing)
 Miller (automobile), a former U.S. car maker
 Miller Brewing Company, a U.S. beer company
 Miller Camera Support Equipment, an Australian tripods and fluid heads manufacturer
 Miller Electric, a company that makes arc welding and cutting equipment
 Miller's (publisher), a U.K. publishing company established by William Miller
 Miller's of Tennessee, a defunct U.S. chain of department stores
 RW Miller, a defunct Australian coal, hotel and shipping company

Law
 United States v. Miller, a 1939 case involving the Second Amendment to the United States Constitution
 Miller v. California, a 1973 case involving the First Amendment to the United States Constitution that resulted in the Miller test of obscenity
 Miller v. Alabama, a 2012 case holding unconstitutional mandatory sentences of life without parole for juveniles
 R (Miller) v Secretary of State for Exiting the European Union, a 2016 case about the right of the UK Government to withdraw from the European Union
 Miller v. Bonta, a 2021 case in California involving the Second Amendment to the United States Constitution

Sports
 Alexander City Millers, a minor league baseball team
 Holyoke Millers, a minor league baseball team
 Mayodan Millers, a minor league baseball team
 Minneapolis Millers, a minor league baseball team
 Minneapolis Millers (AHA), a minor league ice hockey team
 Minneapolis Millers (IHL), a minor league ice hockey team
 Rotherham United F.C., a football (soccer) team in England nicknamed The Millers
 Steinbach Millers, an amateur league ice hockey team

Other uses
 an outdated synonym for a milling machine
 Miller (typeface), a typeface designed by Matthew Carter in 1997

See also

 
 
 Fort Miller, California
 Millar, a surname
 Mill (disambiguation)